The meridian 174° east of Greenwich is a line of longitude that extends from the North Pole across the Arctic Ocean, Asia, the Pacific Ocean, New Zealand, the Southern Ocean, and Antarctica to the South Pole.

The 174th meridian east forms a great circle with the 6th meridian west.

From Pole to Pole
Starting at the North Pole and heading south to the South Pole, the 174th meridian east passes through:

{| class="wikitable plainrowheaders"
! scope="col" width="130" | Co-ordinates
! scope="col" | Country, territory or sea
! scope="col" | Notes
|-
| style="background:#b0e0e6;" | 
! scope="row" style="background:#b0e0e6;" | Arctic Ocean
| style="background:#b0e0e6;" |
|-
| style="background:#b0e0e6;" | 
! scope="row" style="background:#b0e0e6;" | East Siberian Sea
| style="background:#b0e0e6;" |
|-valign="top"
| 
! scope="row" | 
| Chukotka Autonomous Okrug Kamchatka Krai — from 
|-
| style="background:#b0e0e6;" | 
! scope="row" style="background:#b0e0e6;" | Bering Sea
| style="background:#b0e0e6;" |
|-
| 
! scope="row" | 
| Alaska — Nizki Island
|-
| style="background:#b0e0e6;" | 
! scope="row" style="background:#b0e0e6;" | Pacific Ocean
| style="background:#b0e0e6;" | Passing just east of Abemama atoll,  (at )
|-
| 
! scope="row" | 
| North Island — North Auckland Peninsula
|-
| style="background:#b0e0e6;" | 
! scope="row" style="background:#b0e0e6;" | Pacific Ocean
| style="background:#b0e0e6;" |
|-valign="top"
| 
! scope="row" | 
| North Island — passing just west of the city of New Plymouth (at )
|-
| style="background:#b0e0e6;" | 
! scope="row" style="background:#b0e0e6;" | Pacific Ocean
| style="background:#b0e0e6;" |
|-valign="top"
| 
! scope="row" | 
| South Island — passing just east of the town of Blenheim (at )
|-
| style="background:#b0e0e6;" | 
! scope="row" style="background:#b0e0e6;" | Pacific Ocean
| style="background:#b0e0e6;" |
|-
| style="background:#b0e0e6;" | 
! scope="row" style="background:#b0e0e6;" | Southern Ocean
| style="background:#b0e0e6;" |
|-
| 
! scope="row" | Antarctica
| Ross Dependency — claimed by 
|-
|}

See also
 173rd meridian east
 175th meridian east

e174 meridian east